Saint-Ismier is a commune in the Isère department in southeastern France. It is part of the Grenoble urban unit (agglomeration).

Population

Twin towns
It is twinned with the English town of Stroud in Gloucestershire.

See also
Communes of the Isère department

References

Communes of Isère
Isère communes articles needing translation from French Wikipedia